Wrecktrospective is a three-disc compilation album released December 8, 2009 by Fat Wreck Chords. Subtitled "Twenty Years...and Counting!", it compiles tracks spanning the label's catalog from 1990 to 2009. The first disc, titled Fattest Hits, collects songs from 33 of the label's album releases. The second disc, Demos, includes 28 demo recordings and rare tracks, a majority of which are previously unreleased. The third disc, Fat Club, includes all of the tracks from the Fat Club series of 7-inch singles released monthly by the label from February 2001 to January 2002. In total the compilation includes 88 songs by 51 different artists.

Critical reception 

James Christopher Monger of Allmusic remarked that Wrecktrospective "sums up the record company’s devotion to all things punk, as in classic, pop, and skatepunk, alternative folk, post-punk, and screamo. A decent balance of the old guard and the new (from the Descendents to Against Me!) keeps things fresh and fun, while the relative brevity of punk songs in general makes for a truly stocked jukebox of high-energy, high-quality, classically minded modern punk."

Track listing

References 

2009 compilation albums
Punk rock compilation albums
Hardcore punk compilation albums
Record label compilation albums
Demo albums
Fat Wreck Chords compilation albums